Burton Albert Jastram (June 5, 1910 – May 20, 1995) was an American rower who competed in the 1932 Summer Olympics and won the Gold Medal as a member of the American boat in the Eights Competition at the Long Beach Marine Stadium, beating the Italian crew from the University of Pisa by inches. Jastram won 1st Place in Eight Oared Shell - 6m. 6s. in the final tryouts at Worcester, MA held by The American Olympic Committee to select a team to represent the United States of America at the games of the X Olympiad Los Angeles, California 1932.

Personal life

Burt Jastram was the son of Burton Albert Jastram Sr. and Alma Marie Smith of Lakeshore Avenue in Oakland and grandson of German immigrants, Joachim Christian Ludwig Jastram and Sophia Mernitz.  He was born in San Francisco and raised as an only child.  "Iron Man" Jastram, a graduate of Oakland High School, rowed in the No. 4 position and set the crew record of having more hours in the California university shell than any other oarsman at the time.

He graduated from the University of California at Berkeley with a degree in architecture and a seat on the United States' Olympic rowing crew. After winning his Olympic Gold Medal he did post-graduate work in Engineering and began a career with Standard Oil of California.
  
Jastram was Chief Architect with Standard Oil and supervised construction of the company's towers—one 20- and one 40-story building, as well as a garden plaza on Market Street in San Francisco.

On June 9, 1935, Jastram married Frances Wanless Christie.  A daughter, Cathy Ann, was born to the couple on July 24, 1942.

Jastram belonged to the Museum Societies of both San Francisco and Oakland, Delta Sigma Chi Architectural Honor Society, National Trust for Historic Preservation, The Big "C" Society, and was a life member of the Mechanics' Institutes.

References

External links
 
 
 
 
 The Crew of '32
  California Golden Bears Olympians

1910 births
1995 deaths
Rowers from San Francisco
Rowers at the 1932 Summer Olympics
Olympic gold medalists for the United States in rowing
American male rowers
20th-century American architects
Professional certification in architecture
Medalists at the 1932 Summer Olympics
American people of German descent